Mohamed Larbi (born 2 September 1987) is a Tunisian professional footballer who plays as a midfielder.

Career

FC Nantes
Larbi hails from the famous FC Nantes Academy where he played from age 13 to 18. He was featured in the documentary "L'Académie du Foot" alongside Dimitri Payet. Larbi was one of the pillar of the FC Nantes team which reached the finals of the 2004 Montaigu U16 tournament, losing to Karim Benzema's Olympique Lyon team. He signed his first professional contract in 2005, with Espérance Sportive de Tunis, one the leading teams in the Tunisian league.

Etoile Sportive du Sahel, Menton, AFC Compiègne, St-Pryvé St-Hilaire
After an unsuccessful experience in Tunisia, Larbi decided to return to France to play in the semi-pro divisions with Menton, AFC Compiègne and St-Privé St-Hilaire.

Luçon VF
Larbi signed with Luçon in third-tier Championnat National in 2011 on a two-year contract. He played for one and half seasons, totalling 77 games and 14 goals. He left the team to sign with Gazélec Ajaccio in February 2013.

GFC Ajaccio
Larbi joined the team for the 2012–2013 season and went on the help the club earn third spot in the Championnat National which secured a return to Ligue 2. During the 2013–2014 season, GFC Ajaccio again won promotion, this time to Ligue 1, with Larbi scoring nine goals.

Larbi made his debut in Ligue 1 in the 2015-2016 season. In his best season by far, he was named twice in the "L'Équipe type de Ligue 1", the best 11 players designated by the newspaper L'Équipe. He played 34 games amassing 9 goals and 3 assists. He scored twice against Girondins de Bordeaux on 31 October 2015 in a 2–1 win and scored another brace against Olympique Lyonnais 20 on December 2015.

In May 2016, Larbi announced that he would not return to GFC Ajaccio for the 2016–2017 season.

In early November 2016, having only played for five minutes in two matches, he was dismissed by the club after failing to attend a warm-down session after a match on 14 October.

Mumbai City FC

Larbi joined Mumbai City FC for the 2019–20 Indian Super League season. He played 11 games amassing 1 goals and 4 assists. In January 2020 he signed contract extension for remainder of the season.

SO Cholet
Larbi returned to France with Championnat National side SO Cholet, signing on 31 August 2020.

International career
Larbi made his debut for Tunisia against Togo on 27 March 2016. In May 2018 he was named in Tunisia’s preliminary 29 man squad for the 2018 World Cup in Russia.

References

External links
 
 
 
 

1987 births
Living people
Association football midfielders
Tunisian footballers
Tunisia international footballers
Saint-Pryvé Saint-Hilaire FC players
Luçon FC players
Tours FC players
Gazélec Ajaccio players
Samsunspor footballers
FC Sochaux-Montbéliard players
Espérance Sportive de Tunis players
Mumbai City FC players
SO Cholet players
Ligue 1 players
Ligue 2 players
TFF First League players
Championnat National players
Tunisian Ligue Professionnelle 1 players
Indian Super League players
Tunisian expatriate footballers
Tunisian expatriate sportspeople in France
Tunisian expatriate sportspeople in Turkey
Expatriate footballers in France
Expatriate footballers in Turkey
Tunisian expatriate sportspeople in India
Expatriate footballers in India
AFC Compiègne players